Aborichthys iphipaniensis is a species of stone loach found in the Iphipani River drainage, upper Brahmaputra basin, Arunachal Pradesh, northeastern India. Habitat: freshwater.

References

 https://researcharchive.calacademy.org/research/ichthyology/catalog/fishcatget.asp?spid=75793

Nemacheilidae
Fish of Asia
Freshwater fish of India
Taxa named by Laishram Kosygin
Taxa named by Shantabala Devi Gurumayum
Taxa named by Pratima Singh(Biologist)
Taxa named by Basudhara Roy Chowdhury 
Fish described in 2019